Ryke Yseøyane is a group of several small islands off the east coast of the island of Edgeøya in Svalbard, Norway. The islands are named after the Dutch whaler Ryke Yse of Vlieland, who discovered them about 1640–1645. The group was first marked by Hendrick Doncker, of Amsterdam, in 1663. Two Norwegian polar bear hunters wintered on Ryke Yseøyane for two subsequent winters in 1967–1969. During the second winter, one of them was lost in drifting ice. They are part of the Southeast Svalbard Nature Reserve.

References

 Conway, W. M. 1906. No Man’s Land: A History of Spitsbergen from Its Discovery in 1596 to the Beginning of the Scientific Exploration of the Country. Cambridge: Cambridge University Press.
 Norwegian Polar Institute Place names in Norwegian polar areas

External links
 Ryke Yseøyane virtual tour

Islands of Svalbard
Uninhabited islands of Norway